Marina Tankaskaya (born July 30, 1983) is an Azerbaijani female  handballer playing for Muratpaşa and the Azerbaijan national team.

She played for  ABU Baku (2001–2006, 2007–2008, 2013–2014) and Garadagh HC Baku  (2006–2007) in her country before she moved to Turkey to join the Istanbul-based team Üsküdar Belediyespor (2009–2010) playing in the Turkish Women's Handball Super League. After one season, she transferred to Muratpaşa Bld. SK (2010–2013) in Antalya. From 2014 on, she plays for Yenimahalle Bld. SK in Ankara.

References

1983 births
Sportspeople from Baku
Azerbaijani female handball players
Azerbaijani expatriate sportspeople in Turkey
Üsküdar Belediyespor players
Muratpaşa Bld. SK (women's handball) players
Yenimahalle Bld. SK (women's handball) players
Expatriate handball players in Turkey
Living people